The Palau nightjar (Caprimulgus phalaena) is a species of nightjar endemic to Palau.  It was formerly considered a subspecies of the grey nightjar.

References

Caprimulgus
Birds of Palau
Endemic birds of Palau
Near threatened animals
Near threatened biota of Oceania
Birds described in 1872